Werner Franz Siebenbrock S.V.D. (27 September 1937 – 24 December 2019) was a Brazilian Roman Catholic bishop.

Siebenbrock was born in Germany and was ordained to the priesthood in 1965. He served as titular bishop of Tacia montana and as auxiliary bishop of the Roman Catholic Archdiocese of Belo Horizonte, Brazil, from 1988 to 1994. He served as bishop of the Roman Catholic Diocese of Nova Iguaçu, Brazil, from 1994 to 2001 and as bishop of the Roman Catholic Diocese of Governador Valadares, Brazil, from 2001 to 2014.

Notes

1937 births
2019 deaths
20th-century Roman Catholic bishops in Brazil
21st-century Roman Catholic bishops in Brazil
20th-century German Roman Catholic priests
Roman Catholic bishops of Belo Horizonte
Roman Catholic bishops of Governador Valadares
Roman Catholic bishops of Nova Iguaçu
Divine Word Missionaries Order